River City Ransom, later released as Street Gangs in the PAL regions, is an open world action role-playing beat 'em up video game originally for the Nintendo Entertainment System. It was developed by Technōs Japan and originally released in Japan on April 25, 1989. It is the third game in Technos' Kunio-kun series released for the console, preceded by Renegade and Super Dodge Ball. Like its predecessors, River City Ransom underwent great changes in its storyline and graphical presentation during its localization in order to make the game more palatable in the Western market. It was one of the first console games published by North American subsidiary American Technos.

Remakes of the game have been released for the Sharp X68000, PC-Engine Super CD-ROM², and Game Boy Advance (GBA). The NES version was re-released for the Nintendo Wii Virtual Console in 2007 as well as the Nintendo Wii U Virtual Console in October 2015. It was also released on the Nintendo 3DS Virtual Console in the PAL Regions on July 25, 2013 and in North America on November 14. It was released again on the Nintendo Switch Online service on its launch day, September 18, 2018.

Gameplay

The plot follows high school students Alex and Ryan as they cross River City in an attempt to reach River City High and rescue Ryan's girlfriend Cyndi from the clutches of a villain called "Slick". Along the way, they battle with gangs of students (with names such as "The Generic Dudes", "The Frat Guys", "The Jocks" or "The Squids") and several gang leaders which act as bosses or sub-bosses.

River City Ransom is a beat 'em up game with action role-playing elements. The game is non-linear, allowing players to explore an open world, in a sandbox manner. The fighting style is very similar to Double Dragon, in that the player can move freely around the screen while pressing buttons to punch, kick, or jump. Objects such as brass knuckles, steel pipes, and trash cans can be used as melee weapons or thrown at enemies. However, the characters' effectiveness in battle is determined by several statistics and their knowledge of fighting techniques, such as Grand Slam, Stone Hands, and Dragon Feet, which are purchased as books in shops throughout the city using funds recovered from defeated gang members. This loot may also be spent on various food items and spa treatments which serve to not only revitalize the player's stats, but may also permanently increase attributes like "Punch" and "Kick" (Foods and items offer varying levels of improvement).

The player can input passwords that keep track of their character's stats, skills, possessions, money, and defeated bosses. There are a total of nine gangs in the original NES version (which are distinguished by the color of their t-shirts) whom the player will encounter during the course of the game, each with their own characteristics and attacking patterns.

Development
River City Ransom is an English localization of the video game Downtown Nekketsu Monogatari, which is the third title starring Technōs Japan's mascot character Kunio, who previously appeared in Nekketsu Kōha Kunio-kun and Nekketsu Kōkō Dodgeball Bu (the Japanese versions of Renegade and Super Dodge Ball respectively). This is the first game in the series where Kunio teams up with his rival Riki, who fought against Kunio in the previous games. The gangs the players fight in the Famicom version are all students from different high schools and many of the characters introduced in this game would reappear in subsequent Kunio-kun games (particularly those that were directed by Sekimoto and Yoshida).

In addition to anglicizing all of the characters' and locations' names, as well as the game's dialog in the English translation, the characters' sprites were also redrawn, replacing their Japanese school uniforms with t-shirts and jeans.

The number of difficulty settings was reduced from three to two (the easiest difficulty setting was removed and the Medium setting in the Famicom version became the Novice setting in the NES version) and an alternative 2-player mode (2P Play B) which disables player-against-player damage was removed too. In addition to a Password feature, the Japanese version also features support for the Turbo File, a peripheral released only in Japan that allows the player to save and load game data.

River City Ransom was the first console game localized by Technōs Japan's U.S. subsidiary, American Technos Inc. Although most of Technōs Japan's previous games (such as Renegade and Double Dragon) were released in North America as well, they were licensed out to other publishers. The second and final NES game released by American Technos was Crash 'n the Boys: Street Challenge, which was also a Kunio-kun game.

Another localization, called Downtown Nekketsu Story, was released, which more closely resembled the original Japanese Famicom version than River City Ransom, with a more accurate English translation. Along with other Kunio-kun Famicom games that were fully translated, this version was released as part of Double Dragon & Kunio-kun Retro Brawler Bundle for PlayStation 4 and Nintendo Switch, which was released on February 20, 2020 in North America.

Ports

X68000
Downtown Nekketsu Monogatari was ported to the Sharp X68000, a Japanese computer platform, and released in April 1990. This version of the game, which was developed by SPS and published by Sharp, features several enhancements to the Famicom original, such as displaying three enemy characters on-screen instead of just two, slightly more colorful graphics, an expanded game world, and new items and special techniques for the player (including some that were only used by certain enemy characters in the Famicom version, such as the headbutt and the whirlwind kick). The new locations includes several new shops (such as a dojo) and the schools of each enemy gang, each featuring two new bosses. In addition to the player's regular stats, the player also has individual stats for all the special techniques their character has acquired. The more frequently a special move is used to finish off enemies, the stronger that particular move becomes. Unlike the Famicom version, the X68000 does not feature adjustable difficulty settings. The player can save and load their progress in one of ten save files provided by the game itself.

PC Engine
The PC Engine Super CD-ROM² version of Downtown Nekketsu Monogatari, released on December 24, 1993, was published by Naxat Soft and developed by KID, the same team that did the PC Engine versions of Nekketsu Kōkō Dodgeball (Super Dodge Ball), Double Dragon II: The Revenge, and Downtown Nekketsu Kōshinkyoku. This version features enhanced graphics, an arranged redbook soundtrack and fully voiced characters, with the voices of Kunio and Riki performed by Ryō Horikawa and Nobutoshi Canna respectively. The player's progress is saved in this version on the PC Engine's backup memory. The rest of the game is almost identical to the Famicom version.

Game Boy Advance

A GBA version of the game, titled  was released in Japan on March 5, 2004 and in North America on May 26. This remake was developed by Million and published by Atlus. The most notable change from the original version is the loss of a true cooperative mode. Instead, the game can be played with an AI-controlled partner, and players may exchange the data of their own characters to fight alongside each other. The GBA version also includes a vast number of configurable options that can adjust game play on the fly, such as changing AI behaviour, the number of enemies in one map area, and shop item reshuffling frequency. The password system is replaced by battery backup, which allows saving up to 12 characters. Character's appearances, keystrokes for learned techniques, even enemy characters can be customized and saved using secret shop items. A saved game does not store story progress or reputation, but it does store the player's statistics, techniques, current items and money, player's name, and customized appearances. The player can gain additional computer-controlled allies and form a "posse" who helps the player on his adventure. Some of these boss characters are from the original NES version, while others are taken from later Downtown Nekketsu games. The player can be accompanied by up to three AI-controlled partners.

Digital ports
Many years after the original NES version was released, it was digitally ported to four more Nintendo systems: the Wii, Nintendo 3DS, Wii U and Nintendo Switch.

The first digital port of River City Ransom was released on the Wii Virtual Console in Japan on October 23, 2007, in PAL regions on February 21, 2008, and in North America on April 21. The western NES titles, graphics, and storylines for the latter two releases were left intact.  Ransom was next released on the 3DS Virtual Console available through the 3DS eShop in Japan on November 28, 2012, PAL region on July 25, 2013 and North America on November 14. Like other 3DS Virtual Console games, the user is able to create a restore point in the game. It also features a two player mode via download play. Only one person needs to own a copy of the game in order to play, and restore points are disabled during two player mode. Three years later Ransom was then made available on the Wii U Virtual Console, and another three years later, it was also released on the NES emulator available through the Nintendo Switch Online service worldwide on September 18, 2018, complete with HD graphics and the ability to create save states, like the other NES games offered.

Reception

Outside Japan, River City Ransom was not highly successful when initially released. However, due to its unique gameplay and sense of humor, it is today considered a cult classic. This cult following, combined with the game's character and humor, inspired parallel works.

It initially received mixed reviews upon release. Japanese magazine Famitsu reviewed the game under its original Japanese title of Downtown Nekketsu Monogatari and gave it a generally positive review, stating that it is a fighting game which skillfully incorporates RPG elements, scoring it 28 out of 40. French magazine Player One reviewed the game under its European localised title of Street Gangs and gave it a highly positive review, concluding that it is not to be missed and scoring it 93%. UK television programme GamesMaster generally panned Street Gangs, with one reviewer saying he "would rather sit in a vat of horse manure than play this game, give it to your worst enemies", with an overall score of 32%.

Retrospective reviews have been very positive. IGN said that the fighting mechanics are exceptionally achieved, and that the RPG-esque elements give the game a depth and replayability, ultimately scoring it 9 out of 10. In 2006, Play contributing editor Eric Patterson listed the game's cover art, along with Groove on Fight, as his favorite game covers of all time. In 2008, Nintendo Life gave it 8 out of 10. EuroGamer gave it an 8 out of 10. In 2009, IGN ranked it the 15th best NES game in their Top 100 NES Games list. In 2012, GamesRadar ranked it the seventh best NES game ever made. The staff felt that it was more memorable than Ghosts 'n Goblins, Legend of Kage, and Double Dragon, and is still influential. In 2014, GamesRadar ranked it the eleventh best NES game of all time. In 2017, Paste ranked it 16th in their 100 Best NES Games list. Also in 2017, Polygon ranked it 461st in their 500 best games of all time list. In 2021, Retro Gamer included the game in their Top Ten NES Games list.

GameSpy gave the GBA version a score of 4/5. GameSpot gave it 6.9.

Legacy
The Japanese version, Downtown Nekketsu Monogatari, was considered highly successful and would be followed by several spin-offs (including seven subsequent Famicom installments) until Technos Japan's closure in 1996. Of these seven games, Downtown Special: Kunio-kun no Jidaigeki dayo Zen'in Shugo features the same gameplay system as Monogatari, with the main difference being that the characters are re-enacting a jidaigeki play.

In 1994, a prequel was released for the Super NES titled Shin Nekketsu Kōha: Kunio-tachi no Banka.

In 2002, an aspiring game designer, tester for Atari, and longtime fan of the game obtained the title's trademark and began work on a sequel aptly titled River City Ransom 2. The project was halted when it was announced at the Electronic Entertainment Expo in 2003 that River City Ransom EX was to be released the following year. A true sequel to the game, was developed by Miracle Kidz for a Japanese release on WiiWare in 2011. An online PC version was due out in 2012, but was put on hold due to an announcement that the developers were freezing development to focus on making completely original games.

In 2013, the Canadian independent developer, Conatus Creative, began development on an officially licensed follow-up game, named River City Ransom: Underground, originally scheduled for Windows in August 2014. In September, Conatus Creative launched a campaign on the crowdfunding site, Kickstarter, seeking CA$180,000 in funding for the game. They successfully reached their funding goal, ending it on October 9, having collected $217,643, approximately 120% of the original goal. After years of development and negotiations with Arc System Works (which, as Technōs Japan's parent company, currently own the rights for the Kunio-kun franchise), the game was released on Steam for Windows, OS X and Linux on February 27, 2017.

River City: Tokyo Rumble was released for the Nintendo 3DS on August 8, 2013 in Japan, December 29, 2015 in Korea, and September 27, 2016 in the United States. River City Girls, which was being developed by Wayforward, was released on PlayStation 4, Nintendo Switch, Xbox One, and PC on September 5, 2019.

Kunio, Riki, Gouda, and the Hattori Brothers make an appearance in Super Smash Bros. Ultimate as fighting spirits.

Notes

References

External links
 Official River City Ransom EX webpage 

1989 video games
2004 video games
Arc System Works franchises
Arc System Works games
Atlus games
Cooperative video games
Game Boy Advance games
High school-themed video games
Infogrames games
Kunio-kun
Multiplayer and single-player video games
Nintendo Entertainment System games
Nintendo Switch Online games
Open-world video games
Organized crime video games
X68000 games
Side-scrolling beat 'em ups
Technōs Japan beat 'em ups
TurboGrafx-CD games
Video games developed in Japan
Virtual Console games
Virtual Console games for Wii U